This page describes the qualification procedure for EuroBasket 2013.

Map

Qualified teams
Eight teams have secured their places at the EuroBasket 2013 before the qualification process. Sixteen teams qualified through the Qualifying Round.

5 Groups of 5 Teams, 1 Group of 6 Teams
(The First 2 Teams of each group and the 4 best third placed teams will qualify for EuroBasket 2013)

Qualified as the host nation:

Qualified through the participation at the 2012 Olympic basketball tournament

Qualified through the participation at the 2012 FIBA World Olympic Qualifying Tournament

Qualified through the qualification

Qualification format
31 teams were drawn into 5 groups of 5 teams and one more group of 6 teams. The first 2 teams in each group and the 4 best third place teams qualified for EuroBasket 2013. The games were played between 15 August and 11 September 2012.

Group seedings

Qualifying round
The qualification draw took place on 4 December 2011 in Freising, Germany.

Group A

All times are local

Group B

All times are local

Group C

All times are local

Group D

All times are local

Group E

All times are local

Group F

All times are local

Ranking of third-placed teams
The four best third-placed teams from the groups qualified automatically for the tournament.  As some groups contain six teams and some five, winning percentage is used.

References

External links 
 2013 FIBA Eurobasket official website

qualification
2012–13 in European basketball
2013